Hopi Champa is the debut album from Ali Baba's Tahini (best known as the band Jake Cinninger was in before joining progressive rock band Umphrey's McGee). The group, rounded out by singer/songwriter/bassist/sitarist Karl Engelmann and drummer Steve Krojniewski, was a popular attraction in the midwest United States in the late 1990s.

The album has long been out of print, and features early versions of Umphrey's McGee classics like "40's Theme" and "Kabump", as well as Engelmann's trademark classic "42nd Street", which is currently performed by his band Mother Vinegar.

Track listing
 "Hopi Champa I"
 "42nd Street"
 "40's Theme"
 "Lockspot"
 "Psychic Reservoir"
 "Kabump"
 "Phylntorious Interlude" 
 "Plastic Junk"
 "Vegetables"
 "Pumpkins and Napkins"
 "Space Funk Booty"
 "Hopi Champa II"

Personnel

 Karl Engelmann - vocals, bass, guitar, sitar
 Jake Cinninger - guitar, vocals
 Steve Krojniewski - drums

External links
 [ Hopi Champa entry] at Allmusic

1999 albums